Musa Khan (r. 1599–1610) was the leader of the Bara-Bhuiyans of Bengal following the death of his father, Isa Khan.

Early life and family

Musa Khan was born into a Bengali Muslim family from Sarail. He was the eldest son of Isa Khan, probably by his first wife Fatima Bibi, who was the daughter of Ibrahim Danishmand. His great-grandfather, Bhagirath of the Bais Rajput clan, migrated from Ayodhya to serve as the Dewan of the Sultan of Bengal Ghiyasuddin Mahmud Shah. Khan's grandfather, Kalidas Gazdani, also served as Dewan and accepted Islam under the guidance of Ibrahim Danishmand, taking on the name Sulaiman Khan. Sulaiman married the Sultan's daughter Syeda Momena Khatun and received the Zamindari of Sarail which passed onto Musa Khan's father. Musa Khan had two younger brothers, Abdullah Khan and Mahmud Khan. Along with his maternal cousin Alaul Khan, the three of them assisted Musa Khan when he was fighting against the Mughals. He also had another brother called Ilyas Khan who later surrendered to the Mughals.

Career

After the death of his father in 1599, Musa Khan inherited the throne of Sonargaon, gaining the vast territory of Bhati and becoming the chief of the Baro-Bhuiyan landlords of Bengal. Continuing his father's legacy, he resisted Mughal invasion for over a decade until 10 July 1610 when he was dethroned and imprisoned by Islam Khan Chishti, the army general of Emperor Jahangir and Subahdar of Bengal Subah.

During the office of Subahdar Ibrahim Khan Fath-i-Jang  (1617-1624), Musa Khan became loyal to the Mughal force and was freed. He actively participated in the conquest of Tripura and the suppression of revolt in Kamrup.

Death
Musa Khan died in 1623 in the city of Jahangirnagar, and was succeeded by his son Masum Khan. He was buried in a place known as Bagh-i-Musa-Khan (Musa Khan's garden). A mosque was built near his tomb by his son, Diwan Munawwar Khan, known as the Musa Khan Mosque. The tomb and mosque are situated within a present-day residence hall compound of Dhaka University.

References

Year of birth unknown
1623 deaths
16th-century Bengalis
17th-century Bengalis
People from Sarail Upazila
Bengali Muslims
17th-century Indian Muslims
16th-century Indian Muslims